The 2018 UEFA Women's Under-19 Championship (also known as UEFA Women's Under-19 Euro 2018) was the 17th edition of the UEFA Women's Under-19 Championship (21st edition if the Under-18 era is included), the annual international youth football championship organised by UEFA for the women's under-19 national teams of Europe. Switzerland, which were selected by UEFA on 26 January 2015, hosted the tournament, which took place between 18 and 30 July 2018.

A total of eight teams played in the tournament, with players born on or after 1 January 1999 eligible to participate.

Spain were the defending champions, and successfully defended the title after beating Germany in the final, and became the first nation to win the women's under-17 and under-19 titles in the same year.

Qualification

A total of 49 UEFA nations entered the competition (including Kosovo who entered a competitive women's national team tournament for the first time), and with the hosts Switzerland qualifying automatically, the other 48 teams competed in the qualifying competition to determine the remaining seven spots in the final tournament. The qualifying competition consisted of two rounds: Qualifying round, which took place in autumn 2017, and Elite round, which took place in spring 2018.

Qualified teams
The following teams qualified for the final tournament.

Note: All appearance statistics include only U-19 era (since 2002).

Final draw
The final draw was held on 23 April 2018, 18:00 CEST (UTC+2), at the Stufenbau in Ittigen, Switzerland. The eight teams (including the Elite round Group 1 winners whose identity was known at the time of the draw) were drawn into two groups of four teams. There was no seeding, except that hosts Switzerland were assigned to position A1 in the draw.

Venues
The eight teams were divided into two groups of four, a group West (Biel/Bienne, Yverdon-les-Bains) and a group East (Wohlen, Zug).

Match officials
A total of 6 referees, 8 assistant referees and 2 fourth officials were appointed for the final tournament.

Referees
 Ivana Martinčić
 Rebecca Welch
 Eleni Antoniou
 Tess Olofsson
 Melis Özçiğdem
 Cheryl Foster

Assistant referees
 Khayala Azizzade
 Hanna Ilyankova
 Nikola Šafránková
 Jenni Mahlamäki
 May Moalem
 Elena Soklevska Ilievski
 Iana Eleferenko
 Jasmina Zafirović

Fourth officials
 Angelika Soeder
 Sandra Strub

Squads

Each national team have to submit a squad of 20 players (Regulations Article 41).

Group stage
The final tournament schedule was confirmed on 30 April 2018.

The group winners and runners-up advance to the semi-finals.

Tiebreakers
In the group stage, teams are ranked according to points (3 points for a win, 1 point for a draw, 0 points for a loss), and if tied on points, the following tiebreaking criteria are applied, in the order given, to determine the rankings (Regulations Articles 17.01 and 17.02):
Points in head-to-head matches among tied teams;
Goal difference in head-to-head matches among tied teams;
Goals scored in head-to-head matches among tied teams;
If more than two teams are tied, and after applying all head-to-head criteria above, a subset of teams are still tied, all head-to-head criteria above are reapplied exclusively to this subset of teams;
Goal difference in all group matches;
Goals scored in all group matches;
Penalty shoot-out if only two teams have the same number of points, and they met in the last round of the group and are tied after applying all criteria above (not used if more than two teams have the same number of points, or if their rankings are not relevant for qualification for the next stage);
Disciplinary points (red card = 3 points, yellow card = 1 point, expulsion for two yellow cards in one match = 3 points);
UEFA coefficient for the qualifying round draw;
Drawing of lots.

All times are local, CEST (UTC+2).

Group A

Group B

Knockout stage
In the knockout stage, extra time and penalty shoot-out are used to decide the winner if necessary.

Bracket

Semi-finals

Final

Goalscorers

Team of the tournament
The UEFA technical observers selected the following 11 players for the team of the tournament (and an additional nine substitutes):

Starting XI:

Goalkeeper
 María Echezarreta

Defenders
 Anna Torrodà
 Sofie Svava
 Lisa Ebert
 Vanessa Panzeri

Midfielders
 Sydney Lohmann
 Rosa Márquez
 Sarah Jankovska
 Géraldine Reuteler

Forwards
 Olga Carmona
 Paulina Krumbiegel

Substitutes:

Goalkeeper
 Lene Christensen

Defenders
 Sara Holmgaard
 Joanna Bækkelund
 Malin Gut

Midfielders
 Marisa Olislagers
 Teresa Abelleira
 Benedetta Glionna

Forwards
 Kelly Gago
 Sophie Haug

References

External links

UEFA Women's Under-19 history: 2017/18
2018 WU19 EURO: Switzerland, UEFA.com

 
2018
Women's Under-19 Championship
2018 Uefa Women's Under-19 Championship
2017–18 in Swiss football
2018 in women's association football
2018 in youth association football
July 2018 sports events in Europe